That Guy Dick Miller is a 2014 documentary directed by Elijah Drenner. The film had its world premiere on March 7, 2014 at South by Southwest and looks into the life and career of character actor Dick Miller. Funding for the film was raised through a Kickstarter campaign.

Synopsis
The documentary surveys the life and acting career of Dick Miller, who has performed in over 170 roles in various films and television shows as a character actor. It features several interviews, as well as footage from many of Miller's performances.

Cast
Interviews include:
Dick Miller
Lainie Miller
Gilbert Adler
Allan Arkush
Meiert Avis
Belinda Balaski
Ira Steven Behr
Kent Beyda
Steve Carver
Julie Corman
Roger Corman
Joe Dante
Jon Davison
Fred Dekker
David Del Valle
Leonard Maltin
Fred Olen Ray
John Sayles
Robert Forster
Mary Woronov

Reception
Critical reception for That Guy Dick Miller has been predominantly positive. Film Threat praised the documentary's use of interviews, as they noted that these would normally be ineffective "because they come off as little more than EPK-publicity materials designed to bow at the altar of an already-known icon" and felt that the interviews in the film came off as showing genuine admiration for Miller. Twitch Film and Ain't It Cool News also gave the film positive reviews, and Ain't it Cool News considered it to be "a warm, worthy tribute to a national treasure!" The Hollywood Reporter gave the film a B−, as they enjoyed the film overall but felt that it "too frequently loses focus".

References

External links
 
 Kickstarter page

2014 films
Documentary films about actors
2010s English-language films